The Nationalist Democratic Assembly is a political party in Bahrain. It is the Bahraini regional branch of the Iraqi-led Ba'ath Party. The party is led by Secretary General Hassan Ali and Deputy Secretary General Mahmoud Kassab. It was established by Bahrainis who had studied in Ba'athist Iraq during the 1960s and 1970s. The party boycotted the 2002 parliamentary election but not the 2006 election. The 2011 parliamentary by-election was boycotted by the party in solidarity with the Bahraini uprising. It is headquartered in Zinj.

The party opposes the government's naturalisation policies, and contends that it is unfair for ethnic Bahrainis to compete equally with foreign workers for jobs. It remains pro-Saddam Hussein and, according to its webpage, supports the Arab Spring. It opposed the 2003 invasion of Iraq, considering it an act of brutality against the Iraqi people. The party actively supports the overthrow of the existing monarchy, with a peaceful transition to democracy.

It is part of a four-party alliance opposing the government, which comprises two Shia Islamist parties (Al Wefaq and the Islamic Action Society) and the leftist National Democratic Action Society.

References

1991 establishments in Asia
1991 in Bahrain
Arab nationalism in Bahrain
Ba'athist parties
Bahrain
Bahraini democracy movements
Political parties established in 1991
Political parties in Bahrain
Socialist parties in Bahrain